Jochen Neuling (born 10 February 1938) is an East German rower who represented the United Team of Germany. He competed at the 1960 Summer Olympics in Rome with the men's coxless pair where they came fourth.

References

1938 births
Living people
West German male rowers
Olympic rowers of the United Team of Germany
Rowers at the 1960 Summer Olympics
Rohrberg